Captain James Dalgleish Pollock VC (3 June 1890 – 10 May 1958) was a Scottish recipient of the Victoria Cross, the highest and most prestigious award for gallantry in the face of the enemy that can be awarded to British and Commonwealth forces.

Details
Pollock was 25 years old, and a corporal in the 5th Battalion, The Queen's Own Cameron Highlanders, British Army during the First World War when the following deed took place at the Battle of Loos, for which he was awarded the VC.:

Further information
He was commissioned into the Cameron Highlanders in 1916 and left the Army in 1919 with the rank of Captain.

James Pollock gained the VC for his outstanding bravery in saving his comrades in the Big Willie trench when it was infiltrated by German bombers. Just over two weeks later his second cousin, James Lennox Dawson also won the VC in the same trenches at the same battle. His actions were remarkably similar. Dawson saved his colleagues in the trench by going over the top, under machine-gun fire, to roll away gas canisters that had been blown open by German shells. Both men were 25 years of age and born within six months of each other in the small Scottish town of Tillicoultry. Both were feted back in Scotland and given the equivalent of a civic reception, James Pollock in Tillicoultry and James Dawson in Alloa, barely a week apart in December 1915.

Royal Observer Corps
Pollock volunteered for service the Royal Observer Corps during World War II. He is recorded as being an Observer Officer and full-time Duty Controller in No 33 Aberdeen (Ayr) Group. As far as is known, he was the only ROC Officer in history of the Corps to hold the Victoria Cross. Along with other members of No 33 Group James Pollock stood down on or before 12 May 1945.

To mark the end of the Second World War the Air Ministry arranged a huge rally at RAF North Weald in Essex from Saturday 23 June to Monday 25 June 1945. Almost 2,000 members of the ROC from all over the United Kingdom were invited to attend the rally. King George VI had already approved the design of an Ensign for the newly formed Royal Observer Corps, the Ensign was RAF blue with the Union Jack in one corner and also bearing the Corps' crest. It was dedicated at a special service held at North Weald on Sunday 24 June 1945. That day the 2,000 observers carried out the first ever uniformed ROC march past to the accompaniment of the RAF Band with the Under Secretary of State for Air, Lord Beatty, taking the salute. The parade then formed into a huge square and the Royal Observer Corps Ensign was presented by Lord Beatty. The Ensign was borne to the drumhead by Observer Lieutenant Pollock VC. In the parade Observer Lieutenant Pollock bore the Ensign flanked by two senior NCO’s at the head of the massed contingent of observers. A filmed record of the day's events is held in the National Archive at the Imperial War Museum, London.

The medal
His Victoria Cross is displayed at the Regimental Museum of Queens Own Highlanders, (Fort George, Inverness-shire, Scotland).

References

Monuments to Courage (David Harvey, 1999)
The Register of the Victoria Cross (This England, 1997)
Scotland's Forgotten Valour (Graham Ross, 1995)
VCs of the First World War - The Western Front 1915 (Peter F. Batchelor & Christopher Matson, 1999)

External links
Location of grave and VC medal (Strathclyde)

1890 births
1958 deaths
British World War I recipients of the Victoria Cross
Queen's Own Cameron Highlanders soldiers
Queen's Own Cameron Highlanders officers
British Army personnel of World War I
People of the Royal Observer Corps
People from Tillicoultry
British Army recipients of the Victoria Cross